The Crimean Tatar language consists of three dialects. The standard language is written in the middle dialect (bağçasaray, orta yolaq), which is part of the Kipchak-Cuman branch. There is also the southern dialect, also known as the coastal dialect (yalıboyu, cenübiy), which is in the Oghuz branch, and the northern dialect, also known as nogai dialect (noğay, çöl, şimaliy), which is in the Kipchak-Nogai branch.

Crimean Tatar has a unique position among the Turkic languages, because its three "dialects" belong to three different (sub)groups of Turkic. This makes the classification of Crimean Tatar as a whole difficult.

Middle dialect 

The middle dialect is spoken in the Crimean Mountains by the sedentary Tat Tatars (should not be confused with the Tat people which speak an Iranic language). Because its speakers comprise a relative majority of Crimean Tartar speakers, the written language is based on the middle dialect.

Standard Crimean Tatar and its middle dialect are classified as a language of the Cuman subgroup of the Kipchak languages and the closest relatives are Karachay-Balkar, Karaim, Krymchak, Kumyk, Urum and extinct Cuman.  The middle dialect, although thought to be of Kipchak-Cuman origin, combines elements of both Cuman and Oghuz languages.

The Cuman language arrived in Crimea with the first Turkic invasions of Crimea by Cumans and Pechenegs in the 11th Century.  The Cuman language as it developed in Crimea is thought to have been the lingua franca of the Crimean Khanate.

Southern dialect 
The southern or coastal dialects is spoken by Yalıboylu ("coastal dwellers") who have traditionally lived on the southern coast of the Crimea. Their dialects belong to the Oghuz group of the Turkic languages which includes Turkish, Azeri and Turkmen. This dialect is most heavily influenced by Turkish and shares much of the vocabulary.

Northern dialect 

Northern, Nogai or Desert dialect (noğay, çöl, şimaliy; in Dobruja: tatarşa, noğayşa, tatça) is spoken by Crimean Tatars in Romania, Bulgaria, Turkey and other countries. It has Nogai influence and even there are people who say that this dialect is part of Nogai language and related to Kazakh, Karakalpak, Kyrgyz, and Nogai proper. This dialect was spoken by former nomadic inhabitants of the Crimean (Nogay) steppe.  It is thought that the Nogays of the Crimea and the Nogais of the Caucasus and Volga are of common origin from the Nogai Horde, which is reflected in their common name and very closely related languages. In the past some speakers of this dialects also called themselves Qıpçaq (that is Cumans).

Alphabet in Dobruja 
Crimean Tatars in Dobruja speak with this dialect, with a slight variation in the alphabet.

*Ââ is not recognized as a separate letter. It is used to show softness of a consonant followed by Aa.

The letters Ĭĭ and Ww are not in the Crimean Tatar alphabet. Tatars in Dobruja, however, use Ĭĭ and Ww. Ĭĭ represents [ɪ] and  Ww represents [w]. Crimean Tatars in Crimea use İi to represent [ɪ] and [i], and Vv represents both [w] and [v], but in Dobruja, İi is [i] and Vv is [v].

Differences 
The dialect is mostly Kipchak-Nogai, but it also has Kipchak-Kuman and Oghuz influences. This means that not every change from Kipchak-Nogai is found in this dialect. One of the differences from the standard dialect is sound changes (not in all words): y→c (yol→col "way"), ç→ş¹ (çay→şay "tee"), f→p¹ (fil→pil "elephant"), u→o¹(bu→bo "this")

The changes are mostly (or only) found in Crimean Tatars in Dobruja (Romania and Bulgaria) and Turkey.

References 

Turkic languages
Crimean Tatar language